Chu Đạt (朱達, ?–160) was the leader of a rebellion in Cuu Chan, which made attacks against the repression of Eastern Han.

Year of birth unknown
160 deaths
Vietnamese rebels
Han dynasty rebels